, previously known as , is a Japanese animation studio located in Nerima, Tokyo, Japan. The company was founded on October 5, 2005 after a split from Group TAC.

Productions

Television series

Original video animations

Films

See also
 Group TAC—Studio Barcelona (Diomedéa) was originally split from Group TAC.
 Shaft—current Diomedéa CEO Makoto Kohara was formerly an animator at Shaft, and has served as a gross outsourcing studio to some of Shaft's productions.

Notes

References

External links
 

 
Japanese companies established in 2005
Animation studios in Tokyo
Mass media companies established in 2005
Japanese animation studios
Nerima